Moru is a Central Sudanic language spoken in South Sudan by the Moru people. Dialects are Agi, Andri, ’Bali’ba, Kadiro, also known as Lakama’di, Miza and Moruwa’di.

Demographics
A 2013 survey reported that ethnic Moro (Moru) reside in Kozi and Ngode Bomas, Kozi Payam, Maridi County, South Sudan.

Literature
The Moru language has been maintained through the use of the language in the church, particularly the Episcopal Church of the Sudan (ECS).  A number of editions of the Prayer Book (Buku Mätu Ro) and the hymn book (Buku Loŋgo ro) have been published over the years.  

The Moru primer 'Kito Lusi ro Luka be' was first published in 1953 and has been reprinted many times since.  This is primarily a primer for use in schools.  An adult literacy primer 'Buzevosite' was also produced in the 1970s and published by New Day Publishers in Juba.  This primer, in keeping with the strong Christian commitment of the Moru people, has a Christian theme.

The New Testament and Psalms, 'Taobaro To'di', was first published in 1951.  The full Moru bible, 'Baibolo Alokado', with both the Old Testament and the New Testament was published by the Bible Society in Sudan in 1999.

In 1981 a collection of local folk tales was published in Moru Kediro in the form of two booklets, one of which is available as a pdf file on the internet: Kitoŋwa Tauni’ba yi and Kitoŋwa ‘di Odo’ba yi.

References

External links
 Buku Mätu Ro Ta Sakaramenta Ro Ndi Ota Aza Känisa Ro Be Kigye Portions of the Book of Common Prayer in Moru

Moru-Madi languages
Languages of South Sudan